Bourgeau Lake is a rock-rimmed alpine lake at the foot of Mount Bourgeau near Banff, in Banff National Park, Alberta. It is a popular hiking destination. The trailhead is located at the Bourgeau Lake parking lot on the southwest side of the Trans-Canada Highway,  from the turnoff for the Banff Sunshine ski resort. The hike takes on average 2.5 to 3 hours one way and ascends  to a maximum elevation of  The trail to the summit of Mt. Bourgeau starts at the western end of the lake.

References 

Lakes of Alberta
Banff National Park